The Franconia football team, also called Franken 11, is a team representing the people of Franconia, located in south-central Germany.

History
The team was founded in 2014 by Rudi Schiebel. They played their first game against Raetia on 29 May 2014; this game was opposed by the Bavarian Football Association as it claimed to be exclusively responsible for organizing any "selected teams."

They entered the 2015 ConIFA European Football Cup but later withdrew. Franconia also took part in the 2016 ConIFA World Football Cup qualification but failed to make it through to the finals.

References 

CONIFA member associations
European national and official selection-teams not affiliated to FIFA
Football in Bavaria
Franconian culture
2014 establishments in Germany
Association football clubs established in 2014